Hana Brejchová (born 12 December 1946) is a Czech former actress. She performed in over 30 movies and is the sister of actress Jana Brejchová.

Filmography

References

External links

1946 births
Living people
Actresses from Prague
Czech film actresses
Czechoslovak film actresses
Czech television actresses
20th-century Czech actresses